National Marine Aquarium may refer to:

 National Marine Aquarium of Namibia
 National Marine Aquarium, Plymouth